Huiyuan may refer to:

Huiyuan (Buddhist) (334–416), a Chinese Buddhist 
Huiyuan, Xinjiang, township in Xinjiang, China
Huiyuan Juice, company headquartered in Beijing, China